Conrad Prebys (August 20 1933 – July 24 2016) was a property developer and philanthropist based in San Diego, California.

Prebys was born on August 20 1933 in South Bend, Indiana, and graduated from Indiana University. He moved to San Diego in 1965 and co-founded Progress Construction. He bought out his partner in 1980. Over the years, Prebys shifted his focus from construction to property ownership. As of 2015 Prebys' Progress Management owned 81 properties in the greater San Diego area and had an estimated net worth of approximately US$1 billion. The Blackstone Group agreed to purchase the Prebys apartment portfolio in 2021.

Prebys owned many apartment buildings, which provided housing for thousands of families with children.  His concern for the well-being of these children resulted in his support of local Boys & Girls Clubs, where these children participate in educational and recreational activities and receive guidance from caring adults.  In appreciation for his generous contributions, Boys & Girls Club facilities in Escondido, Ramona and Santee were named in his honor.

Philanthropy 
Prebys was a prolific philanthropist, and made major donations to biomedical research, higher education, and public broadcasting. His donations helped to underwrite the Conrad Prebys Music Center at the University of California, San Diego and the La Jolla-based Sanford Burnham Prebys Medical Discovery Institute, a nonprofit medical research institute. Other major donations went to PBS's Masterpiece, the San Diego Zoo, San Diego State University, Indiana University, the Salk Institute, and Scripps Health.

In December 2004, just prior to Christmas (his favorite time of year); Conrad Prebys made his first philanthropic gift of $1 million to build the Conrad Prebys Clubhouse in Santee and transform the Boys & Girls Clubs of East County into a premier youth-serving organization. His financial support of the organization enabled the organization to grow in quality and scope of service for the next twenty-plus years.  Thanks to his largess, more children are coming to state-of-the-art facilities in some of East County's neediest neighbourhoods.  The result is a population of children who are positively motivated, physically fit and receiving better grades at school.

In support of San Diego State University (SDSU), Prebys donated $20 million to create endowed scholarships that now support costs of attendance for at least 150 students per year. Recipients of Prebys' scholarship funds include those pursuing biomedical research, those practising the creative and performing arts, those inducted into the Guardian Scholars and SDSU Honors programs, and those studying entrepreneurship and leadership. At the time, his was the single largest gift ever made to San Diego State University. The SDSU campus also recently named its student union the Conrad Prebys Aztec Student Union in his honor.

In the summer of 2014, Prebys donated $25 million to the Salk Institute for Biological Studies, to fund "cutting-edge biological research on a wide range of diseases." His gift was the institute's largest, enabling its researchers to pursue breakthrough medical therapies.

Prebys gave his all-time largest gift of $100 million to the Sanford-Burnham Medical Research Institute in June 2015, to support its 10-year strategic vision to develop and implement innovative medical treatments that can have lasting, positive effects on the field of healthcare. The gift resulted in the renaming of the institute, which is now known as the Sanford Burnham Prebys Medical Discovery Institute.
In October 2015, Prebys donated $20 million to the Indiana University Kelley School of Business to fund the construction of a new campus amphitheater and the Kelley School of Business Conrad Prebys Career Services Center, which began construction in summer 2015. He visited the campus shortly after the gift was made public, where he was greeted with a warm welcome by students, faculty, and Kelley School of Business dean Idie Kesner. Many of the school's students created posters and cards to thank Prebys for his generosity and philanthropic vision for the forthcoming career services center that will bear his name.

Education 
Prebys graduated with distinction from Indiana University's Kelley School of Business in 1955 with a bachelor's degree in business.

During his time as a student at Indiana University, Prebys was an active member in many student organizations including Delta Upsilon fraternity, Indiana University's Playbill theatre group, the Scabbard and Blade Club, the Army ROTC, and Theta Alpha Phi - the national Theatre Honors Fraternity.

In June 2015 Prebys was awarded an honorary Doctor of Humane Letters from San Diego State University's College of Business Administration.

References

People from South Bend, Indiana
American billionaires
Indiana University alumni
1933 births
2016 deaths
20th-century American philanthropists